The Cheat is a 1923 American silent drama film produced by Famous Players-Lasky and distributed by Paramount Pictures, and is a remake of Cecil B. DeMille's 1915 film of the same name using the same script by Hector Turnbull and Jeanie MacPherson. This version stars Pola Negri and was directed by George Fitzmaurice.

Plot
As described in a film magazine review, Carmelita De Cordoba a beautiful young South American woman who has been betrothed by her stern father to Don Pablo, whom she despises, meets and falls in love with Dudley Drake, a New York City broker, while in Paris. Claude Mace, an art swindler masquerading as East Indian Prince Rao-Singh, hopes to marry her for her wealth. Carmelita elopes with Dudley and is disinherited. The Prince, after lending her some money, induces her to dine alone with him. Meanwhile Dudley makes a fortune. Carmelita and the Prince quarrel and she shoots him. Dudley, arriving on the scene, takes responsibility for the crime. He is convicted. Carmelita goes to the court and confesses, showing a brand on her shoulder that is the Prince's work. The verdict is set aside and all is rosy.

Cast

Preservation status
With no prints of The Cheat located in any film archives, it is a lost film.

References

External links

Still at gettyimages.com

1923 films
American silent feature films
Famous Players-Lasky films
Films directed by George Fitzmaurice
Films based on short fiction
Lost American films
1923 drama films
Silent American drama films
American black-and-white films
Films with screenplays by Ouida Bergère
Remakes of American films
1923 lost films
Lost drama films
1920s American films